Acharya Manatunga (c. seventh century CE) was the composer of famous Jain prayer, Bhaktamara Stotra. Acharya Manatunga is said to have composed the Bhaktamara Stotra when he was ordered to be kept in prison for not obeying the orders of King Bhoja to appear in his royal court. He was kept in the prison tied up under chains and 48 locks, and upon chanting the Bhaktamara Stotra all the 48 locks were broken and Acharya Manatunga miraculously came out of the prison.

Life
Manatunga (c. seventh century CE) was the composer of famous Jain prayer, Bhaktamara Stotra. Acharya Manatunga is said to have composed the Bhaktamara Stotra when he was ordered to be kept in prison for not obeying the orders of King Bhoja to appear in his royal court. He was kept in the prison tied up under chains and 48 locks, and upon chanting the Bhaktamara Stotra all the 48 locks were broken and Acharya Manatunga miraculously came out of the prison after attaining self realization.

Bhayahara Stotra, an adoration of Parshvanatha, was also composed by Acharya Manatunga.

References

Citations

Sources

External links

Digambara Acharyas
Indian Jain monks
7th-century Indian Jains
7th-century Jain monks
7th-century Indian monks